This is a list of Pananamian Twenty20 International cricketers.

In April 2018, the ICC decided to grant full Twenty20 International (T20I) status to all its members. Therefore, all Twenty20 matches played between Panama and other ICC members after 1 January 2019 will have T20I status. Panama's first T20I was against Costa Rica on 25 April 2019 in the 2019 Central American Cricket Championship.

This list comprises all members of the Panama cricket team who have played at least one T20I match. It is initially arranged in the order in which each player won his first Twenty20 cap. Where more than one player won his first Twenty20 cap in the same match, those players are listed alphabetically by surname.

Key

List of players
Statistics are correct as of 2 March 2023.

References 

Panama